The Storm is a 1933 Soviet film directed by Vladimir Petrov.

Plot 
The film is based on play by Alexander Ostrovsky, The Storm.

Cast 
 Alla Tarasova as Katerina Petrovna Kabanova
 Ivan Chuvelyov as Tikhon Kabanov, her husband
 Mikhail Tsaryov as Boris Grigoriyevich, her lover
 Varvara Massalitinova as Marfa Ignatovna Kabanova, her mother-in-law
 Irina Zarubina as Barbara Kabanova, her sister-in-law
 Mikhail Zharov as Koudryash 
 Yekaterina Korchagina-Aleksandrovskaya as The Old Seer [Script Name: Feklusha]
 Mikhail Tarkhanov as Saveli Prokofiyevich Dikoy

Awards 
 1934: Venice Film Festival (Cup one of the six best films —  Vladimir Petrov)

References

External links 

1933 films
1930s Russian-language films
Soviet black-and-white films
Films based on works by Alexander Ostrovsky
Soviet drama films
1933 drama films